Witikon is a quarter in the district 7 in Zürich.

It was formerly a municipality of its own, having been incorporated into Zürich in 1934.

Witikon is located between the southwestern flank of the Adlisberg and the western flank of the Öschbrig.

References

External links

District 7 of Zürich
Former municipalities of the canton of Zürich